William Ian Strang, R.E., (11 April 1886 – 23 March 1952) was a British draughtsman and etcher who specialised in topographical subjects.

Biography

Strang was born in London, the eldest son of William Strang, an internationally known etcher, and his wife Alice née Rogerson. He studied at the Slade School of Art from 1902 until 1906 with Henry Tonks and under Jean-Paul Laurens at the Académie Julian in Paris, 1906–8. Strang held his first solo exhibition at the Goupil Gallery in 1914. He served in the Middlesex and Royal Berkshire Regiments (1914–19) during the First World War. Strang also produced some artworks during the War and the British War Memorials Committee purchased one large painting and several drawings of French battlefields from him.

Strang exhibited at the Royal Academy from 1923 and the New English Art Club from 1919. He was an early member of the Society of Graphic Art and exhibited at their first annual exhibition in 1921. Strang was elected an Associate member of the Royal Society of Painter-Etchers and Engravers in 1925 and became a full member in 1930. He also visited and studied in Italy, Belgium, Spain and Sicily. Among his paintings was a notable portrait of James Dickson Innes. In 1944 Strang submitted five drawings of bomb damaged buildings in central London to the War Artists' Advisory Committee, WAAC, and the Committee purchased four of them. WAAC purchased a further two drawings of similar subjects in July 1945 for thirty guineas.

Strang was married to Frances and had a brother, David Strang (1887-1967), who was an artist and printmaker. Ian Strang died at Wavendon, Buckinghamshire, on 23 March 1952. A memorial exhibition was held at the Leicester Galleries in 1952.

Publications
Town and Country in Southern France. 1937. (with Frances Strang)
The Student's Book of Etching. 1938.

References

External links

 
Chateau Fort, Foix Tate Gallery.
Cordes & Alcantra Bridge, Toledo & Place St Salvi, Albi by Ian Strang.

1886 births
1952 deaths
20th-century English painters
20th-century British printmakers
Académie Julian alumni
Alumni of the Slade School of Fine Art
Artists from London
British Army personnel of World War I
British war artists
English etchers
English illustrators
English male painters
World War I artists
World War II artists
20th-century English male artists